Asaphodes beata (also known as the dotted green carpet moth) is a species of moth in the family Geometridae. It is endemic to New Zealand and is a relatively common species that can be found throughout the country in native forest or scrub habitat. It can be distinguished from its close relative Asaphodes adonis by the colour of its hind wings. The larvae of this species feeds on watercress but tends to be inactive during the day. If threatened it will mimic a twig dropping to the ground. The adult moths are on the wing from October to March and are said to be attracted to white rātā. The white markings on the forewing of the adults are variable in appearance.

Taxonomy

This species was first described by Arthur Gardiner Butler in 1877 as Cidaria beata using a specimen from the collection of J. D. Enys. In 1884 Edward Meyrick placed this species in the genus Larentia. George Hudson discussed and illustrated this species both in his 1898 book under the name Xanthorhoe beata and again in his 1928 publication under the name Xanthorhoe benedicata. In 1927 Louis Beethoven Prout synonymised Xanthorhoe benedicta with Xanthorhoe beata. In 1939 Prout placed this species back in the genus Larentia. However this placement was not accepted by New Zealand taxonomists. In 1971 J. S. Dugdale placed this species in the genus Asaphodes. This placement was affirmed by Dugdale in 1988. The male holotype specimen, likely collected at Castle Hill in mid Canterbury, is held at the Natural History Museum, London.

Description

Hudson described the egg of this moth as being:

He described the larvae as:
  The larva forms a frail cocoon on the ground in which it pupates.

Butler originally described the adults of this species as follows:

This species can be distinguished from its close relative A. adonis by the colour of its hind wings. Hudson states that the white markings on the forewings of this moth are variable. This species is very similar in appearance to A. philpotti, to the point where A. philpotti was previously encapsulated within the concept of this species.

Distribution 
This species is endemic to New Zealand. This relatively common species can be found in forest throughout the country.

Behaviour
The larvae of this species is inactive during the day and when threatened mimics a twig dropping to the ground. Adult moths are on the wing from October until March.

Habitat 
This species inhabits native forest and scrub.

Host species 

Hudson stated that the larvae of this species feed on watercress. Larvae have also been found on native herb plants in the genera Epilobium, Cardamine, and Stellaria. Adults are said to be attracted to the flowers of the white rātā.

References

External links

 Specimens held at the Auckland Museum.

Moths described in 1877
Moths of New Zealand
Larentiinae
Endemic fauna of New Zealand
Taxa named by Arthur Gardiner Butler
Endemic moths of New Zealand